Nana is a French-Italian film by Christian-Jaque starring Martine Carol and Charles Boyer. An adaptation of the 1880 novel Nana by Émile Zola, it tells the story of two French aristocrats who are fatally ruined by their obsession for Nana, a mediocre actress and prostitute. Using the ancient theme of a worthless woman beguiling powerful men, the film portrays the moral corruption of the nominally Catholic court and nobility under the Second Empire.

Plot
Nana, who appears nightly at a downmarket Parisian theatre where her impudence and the scantiness of her costumes make up for her lack of dramatic talent, supplements her income by assignations with admirers. She catches the eye of Muffat, a faithful Catholic husband who is a trusted aide of the Emperor. By perseverance and heavy expenditure, he makes her his exclusive mistress in a palatial private residence. His wife leaves him, his daughter's fiancé breaks off their engagement, and his fortune has gone.

Vandeuvres, his most persistent rival, imports a promising filly and bets heavily on her first race. Sure of a major coup, he persuades Nana to join him at the railway station for Italy. The horse wins and Nana starts packing her bags but, when the stewards find that the losing horse was doped, Vandeuvres commits suicide. Going round to Nana's mansion, Muffat finds her about to depart and, when she says she is leaving him for Vandeuvres, he strangles her.

Cast 
 Martine Carol as Nana 
 Charles Boyer as Count Muffat
 Jacques Castelot as Duke of Vandeuvres
 Jean Debucourt as Napoléon III
 Walter Chiari as Fontan
 Noël Roquevert as Steiner, the banker
 Dora Doll as Rose Mignon
 Elisa Cegani as Countess Muffat
 Paul Frankeur as Bordenave
 Pierre Palau as Vénot 
 Nerio Bernardi as Prince of Sardinia
 Dario Michaelis as Fauchery
 Daniel Ceccaldi as Lieutenant Philippe Hugon
 Marguerite Pierry as Zoé 
 Luisella Boni as Estelle Muffat 
 Jacqueline Plessis as Empress Eugénie  
 Jacques Tarride as Mignon
 Paul Amiot as Police Commissioner
 Daniel Mendaille as Le valet (uncredited)

References

External links 
 

1955 films
1950s historical films
Films based on works by Émile Zola
Films directed by Christian-Jaque
French historical films
1950s French-language films
Italian historical films
1950s French films
1950s Italian films